The Albertans is a Canadian dramatic television miniseries which aired on CBC Television in 1979.

Premise
The drama resembled a Canadian version of Dallas, with the plot involving the cattle ranching and petroleum industries, eco-terrorism and First Nations land claims.

Cast
 Albert Angus as Johnny
 George Clutesi as Isaac, Johnny's grandfather, an aboriginal
 Anne Collinge as Clair, Carl Hardin's daughter-in-law
 Frances Hyland as Marjanne, Carl Hardin's daughter
 Leslie Nielsen as Don MacIntosh, a petroleum industrialist
 Daniel Pilon as Hans Keller, a German businessman, involved with Clair
 Gary Reineke as Peter Wallen, a construction company operator
 George Waight as Carl Hardin, a former rancher

Scheduling
Three hour-long episodes were broadcast Sundays 9:00 p.m. (Eastern) from 14 to 28 January 1979.

References

External links
 
 

CBC Television original programming
1979 Canadian television series debuts
1979 Canadian television series endings
1970s Canadian drama television series
1970s Canadian television miniseries